Siddha ("perfected one") is a term that is used widely in Indian religions and culture. It means "one who is accomplished." It refers to perfected masters who have achieved a high degree of physical as well as spiritual perfection or enlightenment. In Jainism, the term is used to refer to the liberated souls. Siddha may also refer to one who has attained a siddhi, paranormal capabilities.

Siddhas may broadly refer to siddhars, naths, ascetics, sadhus, or yogis because they all practice sādhanā.

The Svetasvatara (II.12) presupposes a siddha body.

Jainism

In Jainism, the term siddha is used to refer the liberated souls who have destroyed all karmas and have obtained moksha. They are free from the transmigratory cycle of birth and death (saṃsāra) and are above Arihantas (omniscient beings). Siddhas do not have a body; they are soul in its purest form. They reside in the Siddhashila, which is situated at the top of the Universe. They are formless and have no passions and therefore are free from all temptations. They do not have any karmas and they do not collect any new karmas.

According to Jains, siddhas have eight specific characteristics or qualities. Ancient Tamil Jain Classic 'Choodamani Nigandu' describes the eight characteristics in a poem, which is given below.

The following table summarizes the eight supreme qualities of a liberated soul.

Because of the quality of Sūksmatva, the liberated soul is beyond sense-perception and its knowledge of the substances is direct, without the use of the senses and the mind. The quality of avagāhan means that the liberated soul does not hinder the existence of other such souls in the same space.

A soul after attaining siddhahood goes to the top of the loka (as per Jain cosmology) and stays there till infinity. Siddhas are formless and dwell in Siddhashila with the above-mentioned eight qualities.

Hinduism

In Hinduism, the first usage of the term siddha occurs in the Maitreya Upanishad in chapter Adhya III where the writer of the section declares "I am Siddha."

Siddha or siddhar (Tamil tradition)

In Tamil Nadu, South India, a siddha (see siddhar) refers to a being who has achieved a high degree of physical as well as spiritual perfection or enlightenment. The ultimate demonstration of this is that siddhas allegedly attained physical immortality. Thus siddha, like siddhar, refers to a person who has realised the goal of a type of sadhana and become a perfected being. In Tamil Nadu, South India, where the siddha tradition is still practiced, special individuals are recognized as and called siddhas (or siddhars or cittars) who are on the path to that assumed perfection after they have taken special secret rasayanas to perfect their bodies, in order to be able to sustain prolonged meditation along with a form of pranayama which considerably reduces the number of breaths they take. Siddha were said to have special powers including flight. These eight powers are collectively known as attamasiddhigal (ashtasiddhi). In Hindu cosmology, Siddhaloka is a subtle world (loka) where perfected beings (siddhas) take birth. They are endowed with the eight primary siddhis at birth.

The  18 siddhars are listed below.
 
 Agasthiyar
Bogar
 Kamalamuni
 Thirumoolar
 Korakkar
 Konganar
 Sattaimuni
 Machamuni
 Sundaranandar
 Vanmeegar
 Ramadevar
 Nandidevar
 Edaikkadar
 Karuvoorar
 Pambatti Siddhar
 Kuthambai
 Dhanvanthri
 Patanjali

Kashmir Shaivism
In the Hindu philosophy (of Kashmir Shaivism), siddha refers to a siddha guru who can by way of shaktipat initiate disciples into yoga. A siddha, in Tamil siddhar or chitthar (see cit), means "one who is accomplished" and refers to perfected masters who, according to Hindu belief, have transcended the ahamkara (ego or I-maker), have subdued their minds to be subservient to their Awareness, and have transformed their bodies (composed mainly of dense Rajotama gunas) into a different kind of body dominated by sattva. This is usually accomplished only by persistent meditation.

Siddhashrama

In Hindu theology, Siddhashrama is a secret land deep in the Himalayas, where great yogis, sadhus and sages who are siddhas live. The concept is similar to Tibetan mystical land of Shambhala.

Siddhashrama is referred in many Indian epics and Puranas including Ramayana and Mahabharata. In Valmiki's Ramayana it is said that Viswamitra had his hermitage in Siddhashrama, the erstwhile hermitage of Vishnu, when he appeared as the Vamana avatar. He takes Rama and Lakshmana to Siddhashrama to exterminate the rakshasas who are disturbing his religious sacrifices (i.28.1-20).

Siddha sampradaya

Whenever siddha is mentioned, the 84 siddhas and 9 nathas are remembered, and it is this tradition of siddha which is known as the Nath tradition. Siddha is a term used for both mahasiddhas and Naths So a siddha may mean a siddha, a mahasiddha or a nath. The three words are used interchangeably.

The eighty-four siddhas in the Varna(na)ratnakara
A list of eighty-four siddhas is found in a manuscript (manuscript no 48/34 of the Asiatic Society of Bengal) dated Lakshmana Samvat 388 (1506) of a medieval Maithili work, the Varna(na)ratnākara written by Jyotirishwar Thakur, the court poet of King Harisimhadeva of Mithila (reigned 1300–1321). An interesting feature of this list is that the names of the most revered naths are incorporated in this list along with Buddhist siddhācāryas. The names of the siddhas found in this list are:

Siddhas in the Hatha Yoga Pradipika
In the first upadeśa (chapter) of the Hatha Yoga Pradipika, a 15th-century text, a list of yogis is found, who are described as the Mahasiddhas. This list has a number of names common with those found in the list of the Varna(na)ratnākara:

See also

Notes

References

External links

 Details of 18 siddhas
 Tamil siddha tradition

Shaivism
Titles and occupations in Hinduism